Ronald F. Lipsett (born January 19, 1944) is a former politician in Ontario, Canada. He was a Liberal member of the Legislative Assembly of Ontario from 1987 to 1990 who represented the central Ontario riding of Grey.

Background
Lipsett was educated at the University of Western Ontario. He is a fifth-generation cattle farmer in Silcote Corner, near Owen Sound, Ontario. He served as a trustee on the Grey County Board of Education, and a director of Formosa Mutual Insurance Company.

Politics
He was elected to the Ontario legislature in the 1987 provincial election, defeating Progressive Conservative Bill Murdoch by about 2,000 votes in the riding of Grey. Lipsett was a backbench supporter of David Peterson's government during his time in the legislature. He was a parliamentary assistant to the Minister of Energy in 1989-90.

The Liberals were defeated in the 1990 election, and Lipsett placed third against Murdoch and NDP candidate Peggy Hutchinson in his bid for re-election.

Later life
Lipsett returned to the Formosa Mutual Insurance Company (later renamed Trillium Mutual Insurance) after his defeat, and has been marketing manager since 1991. He oversees advertising and sponsorship programs in the company.

References

External links
 

1944 births
Living people
Ontario Liberal Party MPPs
University of Western Ontario alumni